The Community Rule (Serekh haYahad), which is designated 1QS and was previously referred to as the Manual of Discipline, is one of the first scrolls to be discovered near khirbet (ruin of) Qumran, the scrolls found in the eleven caves between 1947 and 1954 are now referred to simply as the Dead Sea Scrolls. The Rule of the Community is a key sectarian document and is seen as definitive for classifying other compositions as sectarian or non-sectarian (1QpHabakkuk; 1QM; the Hodayot; and CD are other core sectarian documents). Among the nearly 350 documents (900+ manuscripts) discovered, roughly 30% of the scrolls are classified as "sectarian".

Discovery
The most complete manuscript of the Community Rule was found in Cave 1, and was first called the Manual of Discipline by Millar Burrows. It is now designated 1QS (which stands for : "Cave 1 / Qumran / "Serekh" = 'rule'). Numerous other fragments of this document, containing variant readings, were found in caves 4 and 5 (4QSa–j, 5Q11, 5Q13). Two other documents, known as the Rule of the Congregation (1QSa) and the Rule of the Blessing (1QSb), are found on the same scroll as 1QS and while they were originally thought to be part of the Community Rule are now considered separate compositions and appendices. The Community Rules contain dualistic writings with Zoroastrian and Roman influences. They talk of War between Angel of Evil, represented as Darkness or Satan and the Son(s) of the Israelite God, represented as light.

Community

There is some debate about the identification of the community described in 1QS. The most significant question that has been asked and debated is the relationship of the scroll to the ruins of the nearby settlement. While the vast majority of scholars would argue that a Jewish religious community in the Second Temple period occupied the site at Qumran and owned the scrolls found in caves nearby, a larger issue related to their identity as "Essenes" continues to be debated to this day. Striking similarities are found between the site of Qumran and rites and practices described in 1QS. Most noteworthy is the concern in 1QS for ritual purity by immersion and the discovery of nearly 10 ritual baths (mikva'ot) at Qumran. Much of the debate about the communities' identification with Essenes has centered on comparing and contrasting Josephus' descriptions of Essenes (he describes other "philosophical schools" such as Pharisees and Sadducees) with the details that emerge from sectarian literature found at Qumran (esp. 1QS) and the site itself. Josephus, for example, describes initiates to a male monastic order who are given a trowel for use when defecating (they are to dig a hole in private, away from the group, and ease their bowels while covering themselves with their robe), a detail about toilet habits that he finds amusing and entertaining for his readership. And yet, the discovery of a toilet at Qumran seems to contradict Josephus. Another question that has arisen, among others, when identifying Josephus' Essenes (see also Philo and Pliny) to the group at Qumran is the presence or absence of women. The cemetery that is adjacent to the settlement has only been partially excavated and there appear to be at least a few skeletal remains of women, which is seen by some to contradict an association between Essenes and the group there.

Scholars of earliest Christianity have traditionally taken note of 1QS because it refers to the messiahs of Aaron and Israel (ix 9–11). This and other writings from the Dead Sea Scrolls have opened a window to the past that allows us to understand ideas and developments related to the religious milieu near to the time of earliest Christianity.

Division
Michael Knibb provides six divisions in 1QS, these are:
 (1) in column i lines 1–15 the ideals of the community are set out;
 (2) in column i line 16 –column iii line 12 the following are described: (a) Ritual and ceremony to enter the community are set out, (b) the covenant should be renewed annually, and (c) the need for inner conversion;
 (3) in column iii line 13 – column iv line 26 dualistic beliefs are set forth;
 (4) in column v line 1 – column vii line 25 are collections of rules, oaths, and rules governing administration, reproof and priestly presence;
 (5) in column viii – column x line 8 are references to a true, spiritual temple (i.e. community) established in the wilderness (wise leader; liturgical calendar);
 (6) in column x line 9 – column xi line 22 is hymn of praise (to creation similar to the Hodayot).

Variant Readings
As opposed to 1QS, manuscript 4QSd (4Q258) has the word God written in paleo-Hebrew letters 𐤀𐤋 (ʼEl) as can be seen on this infrared picture at the Dead Sea Scrolls Digital Library. In addition, 4QSd does not mention 'the Priests, the Sons of Zadok' as does 1QS. Finally, 4QSd and 4QSb read 'ha-rabbim' (the Congregation).

References

Critical edition

External links
 The Community Rule, online viewer
 An Online Transcription of Dead Sea Scroll 1QS (The "Manual of Discipline")
 English Translation
 Williams, Tyler F. "1QS: The Community Rule (Manual of Discipline)." Codex:biblical-studies.ca Retrieved August 2, 2007.

Ancient Hebrew texts
Dead Sea Scrolls
Essene texts
Hebrew manuscripts